The Haseb rocket is an Iranian 107 mm Artillery rocket derived from the Chinese Type 63 multiple rocket launcher. It is mounted on a Haseb mlrs (same name) with 12-tube 2-wheel split rail similar to that of the Type 63 multiple rocket launcher. The rocket has a range of 9 km and a warhead weighing 8 kg.

Operators

See also
Oghab
Noor
Shahin
Arash
Yaqeen-1

References 

Artillery of Iran
Rocket artillery